Doctor Syn: A Tale of the Romney Marsh is the first in the series of Doctor Syn novels by Russell Thorndike.  In this story we are introduced to the complex Christopher Syn, the kindly vicar of the little town of Dymchurch.  Syn seems pleasant but we soon learn that he has a sinister past.  At one time he was the vicious pirate Captain Clegg and he is also the mysterious "Scarecrow of Romney Marsh", masked leader of the local smugglers.

In the other books of the series Syn is presented as a hero, but here he is a much darker character.  He moves from the personality of the gentle clergyman to that of bloodthirsty pirate with frightening ease.  In the end he is murdered by a former pirate crewman who, as Clegg, he had left to die years before.

Though it was written first, the events of this story follow the rest of the series.  Together, the series shows the subtle decline of a good man into madness and show the dark side of the swashbuckling romantic hero.

Doctor Syn was published in 1915.  Though it is the first book written in the series it follows the events of Shadow of Doctor Syn.

External links

 
 

1915 British novels
British historical novels
Novels set in Kent
Novels by Russell Thorndike